USS Margin (SP-2119), also ID-2119, was a United States Navy patrol vessel in commission from 1918 to 1919.

Margin was built as a private motorboat of the same name in 1917 by W. E. Haff at Neptune Island, New York. On 6 December 1917, the 3rd Naval District inspected her for possible naval service, and on 21 March 1918 the U.S. Navy acquired her under a free lease from her owner, W. D. Hatch of Neptune Island, for use as a section patrol boat during World War I. She was commissioned as USS Margin (SP-2119 or ID-2119) on 28 June 1919.

Assigned to the 4th Naval District, Margin served on patrol duty for the rest of World War I. The Navy returned her to Hatch on 1 April 1919.

References

Department of the Navy Naval History and Heritage Command Online Library of Selected Images: Civilian Ships: Margin (Motor Boat, 1917). Served as USS Margin (ID # 2119) in 1918-19
NavSource Online: Section Patrol Craft Photo Archive Margin (SP 2119)

Patrol vessels of the United States Navy
World War I patrol vessels of the United States
Ships built in New York (state)
1917 ships